The Salem Laundry is a historic laundry building at 55 Lafayette Street in Salem, Massachusetts, United States.  It is listed on the National Register of Historic Places as "Salem Landry". The building was erected in 1906 and is the first concrete building to be constructed in Salem.  The four story building is divided into three wide bays, with the central bay projecting slightly.  The bays have broad windows divided by ashlar-tooled concrete blocks, a styling that became fashionable in the following decade before unadorned concrete became more widely used.  The building was built by, and has remained in the hands of, the Hooper family, who established a commercial laundry in Salem in 1806.  It was listed on the National Register in 1983.

See also
National Register of Historic Places listings in Salem, Massachusetts
National Register of Historic Places listings in Essex County, Massachusetts

References

Commercial buildings on the National Register of Historic Places in Massachusetts
Buildings and structures in Salem, Massachusetts
Retail buildings in Massachusetts
National Register of Historic Places in Salem, Massachusetts